Baratta is an occupational surname of Italian origin for a market trader.  Notable people with this name include:

 Alessandro Baratta, (1639–1714), Italian painter and engraver
 Anthony Baratta, (born 1938), Italian-American mobster
 Antonio Baratta (1724–1787), Italian engraver
 Carla Baratta (born 1990), Venezuelan actress and model
 Carlo Alberto Baratta, (c. 1754–1815), Italian painter
 Eumone Baratta (born 1823), Italian sculptor
 Francesco Baratta the elder (c. 1590–1666), Italian Baroque sculptor
 Giovanni Baratta (1670–1747), Italian Baroque sculptor
 Joseph Baratta (born 1971), American businessman
 Paolo Baratta (born 1939), Italian economist
 Pietro Baratta (1659–1729), Italian Baroque sculptor

See also
 
 Barati (disambiguation)

References

Italian-language surnames
Occupational surnames